Carlos Jonás "Charly" Alcaraz (born 30 November 2002) is an Argentine professional footballer who plays as a midfielder for  club Southampton. Prior to signing for Southampton, he played for Racing Club.

Professional career

Racing Club
Alcaraz played for Deportes Infantiles de Villa Elisa, before joining the youth academy of Racing Club in 2017. Alcaraz made his professional debut with Racing Club in a 1–1 Argentine Primera División tie with Atlético Tucumán on 26 January 2020.

He scored the winning goal of the 2022 Argentine Cup Final against Boca Juniors in extra-time sparking a large melee, and being one of ten red cards.

Southampton
In January 2023, he signed a four-and-a-half-year contract for Premier League side Southampton. According to several media, Alcaraz was sold for £12m, and Racing Club also secured 15% of a potential future sale. On 14 January, Alcaraz made his Premier League debut in a 2–1 away victory against Everton, replacing Roméo Lavia in the 61st minute. On 11 February, he scored his first goal for the club in a Premier League match against Wolves, scoring the opener in the 24th minute of a 1–2 home defeat.

Career statistics

Club

Honours 
Racing Club
 Trofeo de Campeones de la Liga Profesional: 2022

References

External links
 
 Racing Club Profile

2002 births
Living people
Footballers from La Plata
Argentine sportspeople of Paraguayan descent
Argentine footballers
Association football midfielders
Racing Club de Avellaneda footballers
Southampton F.C. players
Argentine Primera División players
Premier League players
Argentine expatriate footballers
Argentine expatriate sportspeople in England
Expatriate footballers in England